Robert Bartko (born 23 December 1975 in Potsdam) is a German former road and track cyclist, who competed professionally between 2001 and 2014. Born in the former East Germany, Bartko won two gold medals at the 2000 Summer Olympics in Sydney, Australia: in the individual and in the team pursuit.

Major results

Track

1998
 UCI World Cup Classics
1st Individual pursuit
1st Team pursuit (with Christian Lademann, Daniel Becke and Guido Fulst)
 UCI World Championships
2nd Team pursuit (with Christian Lademann, Daniel Becke and Guido Fulst)
3rd Individual pursuit
1999
 UCI World Championships
1st  Individual pursuit
1st  Team pursuit (with Jens Lehmann, Daniel Becke and Guido Fulst)
 3rd Six Days of Munich (with Scott McGrory)
2000
 Olympic Games
1st  Individual pursuit
1st  Team pursuit (with Jens Lehmann, Daniel Becke and Guido Fulst)
 National Championships
1st  Team pursuit (with Guido Fulst, Andre Kalfack and Andreas Müller)
2nd Individual pursuit
3rd Madison (with Andreas Kappes)
 2nd Six Days of Dortmund (with Silvio Martinello)
 3rd Six Days of Berlin (with Scott McGrory)
 3rd Six Days of Munich (with Erik Zabel)
2002
 3rd Six Days of Berlin (with Andreas Beikirch)
2004
 1st Individual pursuit, 2004 UCI Track Cycling World Cup Classics, Moscow
 2004–05 UCI Track Cycling World Cup Classics, Los Angeles
1st Individual pursuit
1st Madison (with Leif Lampater)
1st Team pursuit (with Robert Bengsch, Henning Bommel and Leif Lampater)
 1st Six Days of Berlin (with Guido Fulst)
 3rd Individual pursuit, UCI World Championships
2005
 1st  Individual pursuit, UCI World Championships
 National Championships
1st  Individual pursuit
1st  Madison (with Guido Fulst)
1st  Team pursuit (with Guido Fulst, Karl-Christian König and Leif Lampater)
 1st Six Days of Bremen (with Andreas Beikirch)
 1st Six Days of Munich (with Erik Zabel)
 2nd Six Days of Berlin (with Guido Fulst)
 3rd Six Days of Dortmund (with Andreas Beikirch)
2006
 1st  Individual pursuit, UCI World Championships
 National Championships
1st  Individual pursuit
1st  Madison (with Andreas Beikirch)
1st  Team pursuit (with Guido Fulst, Karl-Christian König and Robert Kriegs)
 2006–07 UCI Track Cycling World Cup Classics, Moscow
1st Individual pursuit
3rd Team pursuit (with Robert Bengsch, Guido Fulst and Leif Lampater)
 1st Six Days of Stuttgart (with Guido Fulst and Leif Lampater)
 2nd Six Days of Zürich (with Iljo Keisse)
 3rd Six Days of Bremen (with Andreas Beikirch)
 3rd Six Days of Rotterdam (with Andreas Beikirch)
2007
 National Championships
1st  Individual pursuit
1st  Team pursuit (with Guido Fulst, Karl-Christian König and Frank Schulz)
 1st Six Days of Amsterdam (with Iljo Keisse)
 1st Six Days of Ghent (with Iljo Keisse)
 1st Six Days of Rotterdam (with Iljo Keisse)
 2nd Individual pursuit, UCI World Championships
 2nd Six Days of Berlin (with Andreas Beikirch)
 2nd Six Days of Zürich (with Iljo Keisse)
 3rd Six Days of Bremen (with Iljo Keisse)
 3rd Six Days of Dortmund (with Andreas Beikirch)
2008
 1st Six Days of Bremen (with Iljo Keisse)
 1st Six Days of Ghent (with Iljo Keisse)
 1st Six Days of Munich (with Iljo Keisse)
 1st Six Days of Stuttgart (with Iljo Keisse and Leif Lampater)
 2nd Omnium, UEC European Championships
 2nd Six Days of Dortmund (with Andreas Beikirch)
 3rd Six Days of Rotterdam (with Iljo Keisse)
2009
 UEC European Championships
1st  Madison (with Roger Kluge)
2nd Omnium
 1st Six Days of Amsterdam (with Roger Kluge)
 1st Six Days of Berlin (with Erik Zabel)
2010
 1st Six Days of Amsterdam (with Roger Kluge)
 1st Six Days of Zürich (with Danilo Hondo)
 2nd Six Days of Berlin (with Roger Kluge)
 2nd Six Days of Bremen (with Iljo Keisse)
 2nd Six Days of Copenhagen (with Iljo Keisse)
2011
 1st Six Days of Berlin (with Roger Kluge)
 1st Six Days of Bremen (with Robert Bengsch)
 1st Six Days of Ghent (with Kenny De Ketele)
 2nd Six Days of Rotterdam (with Pim Ligthart)
 3rd Six Days of Zürich (with Danilo Hondo)
2012
 1st Six Days of Bremen (with Peter Schep)
 3rd Six Days of Copenhagen (with Leif Lampater)
 3rd Six Days of Ghent (with Silvan Dillier)
2013
 3rd Six Days of Bremen (with Peter Schep)
2014
 1st Six Days of Copenhagen (with Marcel Kalz)
 2nd Six Days of Bremen (with Marcel Kalz)
 3rd Six Days of Berlin (with Theo Reinhardt)

Road

1999
 1st Stage 5b Sachsen Tour
2002
 2nd Overall Niedersachsen-Rundfahrt
1st Stage 5
2003
 1st Stage 4 Tour de Luxembourg
 3rd Overall Tour of Belgium
2004
 1st Overall Driedaagse van West-Vlaanderen
1st Prologue
2005
 1st Stage 1 Tour of Hungary
2007
 3rd Time trial, National Road Championships
2008
 1st Rund um Berlin

References

External links

 

1975 births
Living people
German male cyclists
Cyclists at the 1996 Summer Olympics
Cyclists at the 2000 Summer Olympics
Cyclists at the 2004 Summer Olympics
Olympic cyclists of Germany
Olympic gold medalists for Germany
Sportspeople from Potsdam
Olympic medalists in cycling
UCI Track Cycling World Champions (men)
Medalists at the 2000 Summer Olympics
German track cyclists
Recipients of the Order of Merit of Berlin
People from Bezirk Potsdam
Cyclists from Brandenburg